Biskupice (meaning Bishop's people) is the name of several locations in central Europe:

Poland 
It is a very common place name in Poland, where 29 villages carry that exact name, and 6 others some variation of it. It is also the name for one of the districts of the city Zabrze. Villages include:

 Biskupice, Legnica County in Lower Silesian Voivodeship (south-west Poland)
 Biskupice, Oleśnica County in Lower Silesian Voivodeship (south-west Poland)
 Biskupice, Wrocław County in Lower Silesian Voivodeship (south-west Poland)
 Biskupice, Radziejów County in Kuyavian-Pomeranian Voivodeship (north-central Poland)
 Biskupice, Toruń County in Kuyavian-Pomeranian Voivodeship (north-central Poland)
 Biskupice, Łódź Voivodeship (central Poland)
 Biskupice, Dąbrowa County in Lesser Poland Voivodeship (south Poland)
 Biskupice, Kraków County in Lesser Poland Voivodeship (south Poland)
 Biskupice, Lublin Voivodeship (east Poland)
 Biskupice, Miechów County in Lesser Poland Voivodeship (south Poland)
 Biskupice, Proszowice County in Lesser Poland Voivodeship (south Poland)
 Biskupice, Wieliczka County in Lesser Poland Voivodeship (south Poland)
 Gmina Biskupice, Wieliczka County
 Biskupice, Busko County in Świętokrzyskie Voivodeship (south-central Poland)
 Biskupice, Opatów County in Świętokrzyskie Voivodeship (south-central Poland)
 Biskupice, Pińczów County in Świętokrzyskie Voivodeship (south-central Poland)
 Biskupice, Gmina Brudzeń Duży in Masovian Voivodeship (east-central Poland)
 Biskupice, Gmina Drobin in Masovian Voivodeship (east-central Poland)
 Biskupice, Pruszków County in Masovian Voivodeship (east-central Poland)
 Biskupice, Gniezno County in Greater Poland Voivodeship (west-central Poland)
 Biskupice, Kalisz County in Greater Poland Voivodeship (west-central Poland)
 Biskupice, Konin County in Greater Poland Voivodeship (west-central Poland)
 Biskupice, Ostrów Wielkopolski County in Greater Poland Voivodeship (west-central Poland)
 Biskupice, Poznań County in Greater Poland Voivodeship (west-central Poland)
 Biskupice, Środa Wielkopolska County in Greater Poland Voivodeship (west-central Poland)
 Biskupice, Wolsztyn County in Greater Poland Voivodeship (west-central Poland)
 Biskupice, Częstochowa County in Silesian Voivodeship (south Poland)
 Biskupice, Zawiercie County in Silesian Voivodeship (south Poland)
 Biskupice, Kluczbork County in Opole Voivodeship (south-west Poland)
 Biskupice, Olesno County in Opole Voivodeship (south-west Poland)
 Biskupice, West Pomeranian Voivodeship (north-west Poland)
 Biskupice Radłowskie, a village
 Biskupice Oławskie, a village
 Biskupice Podgórne, a village
 Biskupice Ołoboczne, a village
 Biskupice Melsztyńskie, a village
 Nowe Biskupice, Lubusz Voivodeship, a village in the administrative district of Gmina Słubice, and district of the city of Słubice
 Nowe Biskupice, Masovian Voivodeship, a village in the administrative district of Gmina Warka
 Stare Biskupice, Lubusz Voivodeship, a village in the administrative district of Gmina Słubice
 Stare Biskupice, Masovian Voivodeship, a village in the administrative district of Gmina Warka
 Biskupice-Kolonia, West Pomeranian Voivodeship, a settlement
 Biskupice-Kolonia, Greater Poland Voivodeship, a settlement
 Biskupice Zabaryczne, a village
 Biskupice (Zabrze), a district of Zabrze

Czech Republic 
 Biskupice (u Ronova nad Doubravou) in Pardubice Region
 Biskupice (na Hané), Prostějov District in Olomouc Region
 Biskupice (u Jevíčka) in Pardubice Region
 Biskupice (u Luhačovic) in Zlín Region
 Biskupice-Pulkov in Vysočina Region (Třebíč District)

Slovakia 
 Biskupice, Lučenec a village in Banská Bystrica Region (Lučenec District)
 Biskupice (Bánovce nad Bebravou), district of Bánovce nad Bebravou
 Biskupice (Trenčín), district of Trenčín
 Podunajské Biskupice